Bate, Burkina Faso is a town in the Sidéradougou Department of Comoé Province in south-western Burkina Faso. The town had an estimated  population of 1,098 in 2005.

References

Populated places in the Cascades Region
Comoé Province